The List of painters in the Art Institute of Chicago is a list of the artists indexed in the Art Institute of Chicago website whose works in their collection were painted. The museum's collections are spread throughout eight buildings in Chicago, and not all works are on display. The entire collection houses over 300,000 objects, thousands of which are on view at any given time, and only 2,382 of these are paintings. In the following list, the painter's name is followed by the number of their paintings in the collection, with a link to all of their works available on the Artic website. For artists with more than one type of work in the collection, or for works by artists not listed here, see the Artic website or the corresponding Wikimedia Commons category. Of artists listed, less than 10% are women.
For the complete list of artists and their artworks in the collection, see the website.

A
Gertrude Abercrombie (1909–1977), 5 paintings : Artic
Robert William Addison (1924–1988), 1 painting : Artic
Nicholas Africano (born 1948), 1 painting : Artic
Francesco Albani (1578–1660), 1 painting : Artic
Josef Albers (1888–1976), 4 paintings : Artic
Adam Emory Albright (1862–1957), 1 painting : Artic
Ivan Albright (1897–1983), 44 paintings : Artic
Cosmo Alexander (1724–1772), 1 painting : Artic
John White Alexander (1856–1915), 1 painting : Artic
Alessandro Allori (1535–1607), 1 painting : Artic
Francis Alÿs (born 1959), 1 painting :  Artic
Ghada Amer (born 1963), 1 painting : Artic
Ezra Ames (1768–1836), 1 painting : Artic
Jacopo Amigoni (1682–1752), 1 painting : Artic
Andrea del Sarto (1486–1530), 1 painting : Artic
Benny Andrews (1930–2006), 1 painting : Artic
Albert André (1869–1954), 1 painting : Artic
Fra Angelico (1387–1455), 1 painting : Artic
Master of the Antwerp Adoration (1480–1520), 2 paintings : Artic
Richard Anuszkiewicz (1930–2020), 1 painting : Artic
Apollonio di Giovanni di Tommaso (c. 1414–1465), 2 paintings : Artic
Shusaku Arakawa (1936–2010), 1 painting : Artic
Emil Armin (1883–1971), 2 paintings : Artic
François Arnal (1924–2012), 1 painting : Artic
Ralph Arnold (1928–2006), 1 painting : Artic
David Aronson (1923–2015), 1 painting : Artic
William Artaud (1763–1823), 1 painting : Artic
Richard Artschwager (1923–2013), 1 painting : Artic
John Woodhouse Audubon (1812–1862), 1 painting : Artic
Jules Robert Auguste (1723–1805), 1 painting :  Artic
Milton Avery (1885–1965), 3 paintings : Artic

B
Francis Bacon (artist) (1909–1992), 1 painting (Figure with Meat): Artic
Jo Baer (born 1929), 1 painting : Artic
Giovanni Baglione (1566–1643), 1 painting : Artic
William Bailey (1930–2020), 1 painting : Artic
Enrico Baj (1924–2003), 1 painting : Artic
Balthus (1908–2001), 2 paintings : Artic
Paolo Antonio Barbieri (1603–1649), 1 painting : Artic
Will Barnet (1911–2012), 1 painting : Artic
Frederic Clay Bartlett (1873–1953), 1 painting : Artic
Bartolomeo di Giovanni (1480–1510), 1 painting : Artic
Fra Bartolomeo (1472–1517), 1 painting : Artic
Neroccio di Bartolomeo de' Landi (1447–1500), 1 painting : Artic
Basawan (active 1580–1600), 1 painting : Artic
Georg Baselitz (born 1938), 1 painting : Artic
Jacopo Bassano (1510–1592), 3 paintings : Artic
David Bates (English artist) (1840–1921), 1 painting : Artic
Pompeo Batoni (1708–1787), 4 paintings : Artic
Francisco Bayeu y Subias (1734–1795), 1 painting : Artic
Frédéric Bazille (1841–1870), 2 paintings : Artic
William Baziotes (1912–1963), 1 painting : Artic
Gifford Beal (1879–1956), 2 paintings : Artic
Cecilia Beaux (1855–1942), 1 painting : Artic
Domenico di Pace Beccafumi (1484–1551), 1 painting : Artic
Max Beckmann (1884–1950), 2 paintings : Artic
William Beechey (1753–1839), 1 painting : Artic
Édouard Béliard (1832–1902), 1 painting : Artic
Hippolyte Bellangé (1800–1866), 1 painting : Artic
Jehan Bellegambe (c. 1470 – c. 1535), 2 paintings : Artic
Gentile Bellini (1430–1507), 1 painting : Artic
Giovanni Bellini (1435–1516), 1 painting : Artic
Bernardo Bellotto (1720–1780), 1 painting : Artic
George Bellows (1882–1925), 3 paintings : Artic
Henry Benbridge (1744–1812), 1 painting : Artic
Billy Al Bengston (born 1934), 1 painting : Artic
Frank Weston Benson (1862–1951), 2 paintings : Artic
Thomas Hart Benton (1889–1975), 1 painting : Artic
Bartolomé Bermejo (c. 1436–1440 – c. 1498), 1 painting : Artic
Bernard d'Agesci (1756–1829), 1 painting : Artic
Émile Bernard (1868–1941), 1 painting : Artic
Oscar E. Berninghaus (1874–1952), 1 painting : Artic
Jean-Victor Bertin (1767–1842), 1 painting : Artic
Nicolas Bertin (1668–1736), 1 painting : Artic
Paul-Albert Besnard (1849–1934), 1 painting : Artic
Louis Betts (1873–1961), 3 paintings : Artic
Joachim Beuckelaer (1533–1574), 1 painting : Artic
Charles Biederman (1906–2004), 1 painting : Artic
Albert Bierstadt (1830–1902), 1 painting : Artic
Thomas Birch (1779–1851), 1 painting : Artic
James Bishop (1927–2021), 2 paintings : Artic
Joseph Blackburn (painter) (1700 – c. 1778), 1 painting : Artic
Kathleen Blackshear (1897–1988), 1 painting : Artic
Ralph Albert Blakelock (1847–1919), 2 paintings : Artic
Jacques Blanchard (1600–1638), 1 painting : Artic
Jacques-Émile Blanche (1861–1942), 1 painting : Artic
Carl Blechen (1797–1840), 1 painting : Artic
Eugène Blery (1805–1887), 1 painting :  Artic
Anna Campbell Bliss (1925–2015)
Albert Bloch (1882–1961), 1 painting : Artic
Hyman Bloom (1913–2009), 1 painting : Artic
Peter Blume (1906–1992), 2 paintings : Artic
David Gilmour Blythe (1815–1865), 1 painting : Artic
Mel Bochner (born 1940), 1 painting : Artic
Arnold Böcklin (1827–1901), 1 painting : Artic
Aaron Bohrod (1907–1992), 2 paintings : Artic
Louis-Léopold Boilly (1761–1845), 1 painting : Artic
Giovanni Boldini (1842–1931), 1 painting : Artic
Ilya Bolotowsky (1907–1981), 2 paintings : Artic
Rosa Bonheur (1822–1899), 3 paintings : Artic
Richard Parkes Bonington (1802–1828), 1 painting : Artic
Pierre Bonnard (1867–1947), 3 paintings : Artic
William Bonnell (1804–1865), 3 paintings : Artic
François Bonvin (1817–1887), 1 painting : Artic
Michael Borremans (born 1963), 1 painting : Artic
Hieronymus Bosch (1450–1516), 1 painting : Artic
Fernando Botero (born 1932), 1 painting : Artic
Jan Dirksz Both (1618–1652), 1 painting : Artic
Jessie Arms Botke (1883–1971), 1 painting : Artic
Sandro Botticelli (1444–1510), 2 paintings : Artic
Francesco Botticini (1446–1497), 1 painting : Artic
Raffaello Botticini (1477–1520), 1 painting : Artic
François Boucher (1703–1770), 1 painting : Artic
Eugène Boudin (1824–1898), 3 paintings : Artic
William-Adolphe Bouguereau (1825–1905), 1 painting : Artic
Robert Bourdon (born 1947), 1 painting : Artic
Sébastien Bourdon (1616–1671), 2 paintings : Artic
Dieric Bouts (1415–1475), 1 painting (Christ and the Virgin Diptych): Artic
William Bradford (painter) (1823–1892), 2 paintings : Artic
Georges Braque (1882–1963), 7 paintings : Artic
Victor Brauner (1903–1966), 8 paintings : Artic
Bartholomeus Breenbergh (1598–1657), 1 painting : Artic
Jules Breton (1827–1906), 1 painting : Artic
Jan Brueghel the Elder (1568–1624), 1 painting : Artic
Fidelia Bridges (1834–1924), 1 painting : Artic
Paul Bril (1554–1626), 1 painting : Artic
Bronzino (1503–1572), 1 painting : Artic
Alexander Brook (1898–1980), 1 painting : Artic
Glenn Brown (born 1966), 1 painting : Artic
Roger Brown (1941–1997), 7 paintings : Artic
Agostino Brunias (1730–1796), 1 painting : Artic
Barthel Bruyn the Elder (1493–1553), 1 painting : Artic
Barthel Bruyn the Younger (1530–1610), 1 painting : Artic
Elbridge Ayer Burbank (1858–1949), 8 paintings : Artic
Alberto Burri (1915–1995), 2 paintings : Artic
Bernardino Butinone (c. 1436 – c. 1507), 2 paintings : Artic

C
Giuseppe Cades (1750–1799), 1 painting : Artic
Cai Jai (1680–1760), 1 painting : Artic
Cai Jiating (fl.1796–1820), 1 painting : Artic
Gustave Caillebotte (1848–1894), 2 paintings (Paris Street; Rainy Day): Artic
Denis Calvaert (1540–1619), 1 painting : Artic
Luca Cambiasi (1527–1585), 1 painting : Artic
Charles Camoin (1879–1965), 1 painting : Artic
Heinrich Campendonk (1889–1957), 1 painting : Artic
Canaletto (1697–1768), 2 paintings : Artic
Ricardo Canals y Llambí (1876–1931), 1 painting : Artic
Sarah Anne Canright (born 1941), 1 painting : Artic
Georges Emile Capon (1890–1980), 1 painting : Artic
Suzanne Caporael (born 1949), 1 painting : Artic
Jan van de Cappelle (1626–1679), 1 painting : Artic
Cecco del Caravaggio (active in the 1610s–Rome), 1 painting (Resurrection): Artic
Arthur Beecher Carles (1882–1952), 2 paintings : Artic
Carlo da Camerino (c. 1365 – 1439), 1 painting : Artic
Emil Carlsen (1853–1932), 2 paintings : Artic
Ludovico Carracci (1555–1619), 1 painting : Artic
Leonora Carrington (1917–2011), 1 painting : Artic
Eugène Carrière (1849–1906), 2 paintings : Artic
Carlo Carrà (1881–1966), 1 painting : Artic
Rodney Carswell (born 1946), 1 painting : Artic
Mary Cassatt (1844–1926), 3 paintings (The Child's Bath): Artic
Jean-Charles Cazin (1841–1901), 3 paintings : Artic
Vija Celmins (born Latvia, 1938), 2 paintings : Artic
Paul Cézanne (1839–1906), 9 paintings (The Basket of Apples;The Bathers): Artic
Marc Chagall (1887–1985), 5 paintings (White Crucifixion):  Artic
Chai Zhenyi (17th century), 1 painting : Artic
Charles-Émile-Callande de Champmartin (1797–1883), 1 painting : Artic
Jean-Baptiste-Siméon Chardin (1699–1779), 1 painting : Artic
Nicolas Toussaint Charlet (1792–1845), 1 painting : Artic
Émilie Charmy (1878–1974), 1 painting : Artic
William Merritt Chase (1849–1916), 4 paintings : Artic
Chen Wu (fl.19th Century), 1 painting : Artic
Cheng Zhengkui (c. 1604 – 1670), 1 painting : Artic
Giorgio de Chirico (1888–1978), 3 paintings : Artic
Varda Chryssa (1933–2013), 1 painting : Artic
Chu Ko (born 1931), 3 paintings : Artic
Frederic Edwin Church (1826–1900), 1 painting : Artic
Chōbunsai Eishi (1756–1829), 3 paintings : Artic
Ansano Ciampanti (1474–1532/35), 1 painting : Artic
Pieter Claesz (1597–1660), 1 painting : Artic
Alson S. Clark (1876–1949), 1 painting : Artic
Edward Clark (1926–2019), 1 painting : Artic
Irene Clark (born 1934), 1 painting : Artic
Ralph Elmer Clarkson (1861–1942), 1 painting : Artic
Francesco Clemente (born 1952), 1 painting : Artic
Joos van Cleve (1485–1541), 2 paintings : Artic
Chuck Close (1940–2021), 1 painting : Artic
François Clouet (ca. 1510–1572), 1 painting : Artic
Pieter Codde (1599–1678), 1 painting : Artic
Eleanor Coen (1916–2010), 1 painting : Artic
Marcellus Coffermans (1520/1530–c.1578), 1 painting : Artic
Susanna Coffey (born 1949), 1 painting : Artic
Thomas Cole (1801–1848), 2 paintings : Artic
Samuel Colman (1780–1845), 1 painting : Artic
William Conger (born 1937), 1 painting : Artic
Brian Connelly (1926–1963), 1 painting : Artic
Bruce Conner (1933–2008), 3 paintings : Artic
John Constable (1776–1837), 4 paintings : Artic
Ron Cooper (born 1943), 1 painting : Artic
George Cope (1855–1929), 1 painting : Artic
John Singleton Copley (1738–1815), 5 paintings : Artic
William Copley (artist) (1919–1996), 1 painting : Artic
Augustus Cordus (16th Century), 1 painting : Artic
Lovis Corinth (1858–1925), 1 painting : Artic
Corneille de Lyon (1505–1575), 2 paintings : Artic
Jacob Cornelisz van Oostsanen (1472–1533), 2 paintings : Artic
Michele Felice Cornè (1752–1845), 1 painting : Artic
Jean-Baptiste-Camille Corot (1796–1875), 7 paintings : Artic
Antonio da Correggio (1489–1534), 1 painting : Artic
Cornelis Cort (1533–1578), 1 painting : Artic
Eldzier Cortor (1916–2015), 2 paintings : Artic
Colijn de Coter (1450–1532), 1 painting : Artic
Gustave Courbet (1819–1877), 7 paintings : Artic
Thomas Couture (1815–1879), 1 painting : Artic
Lucas Cranach the Elder (1472–1553), 4 paintings : Artic
Ralston Crawford (1906–1978), 1 painting : Artic
Giuseppe Crespi (1665–1747), 2 paintings : Artic
Carlo Crivelli (1430/35–1495), 1 painting : Artic
Jasper Francis Cropsey (1823–1900), 2 paintings : Artic
Henri-Edmond Cross (1856–1910), 1 painting : Artic
William Cuming (1769–1852), 1 painting : Artic
Charles Courtney Curran (1861–1942), 1 painting : Artic
John Currin (born 1962), 1 painting : Artic
John Steuart Curry (1897–1946), 1 painting : Artic
Aelbert Cuyp (1620–1691), 1 painting : Artic

D
Pascal Dagnan-Bouveret (1852–1929), 1 painting : Artic
Salvador Dalí (1904–1989), 7 paintings : Artic
William Turner Dannat (1853–1929), 1 painting : Artic
Charles-François Daubigny (1817–1878), 4 paintings : Artic
Honoré Daumier (1808–1879), 1 painting : Artic
Gerard David (1460–1523), 1 painting : Artic
Jacques-Louis David (1748–1825), 2 paintings (Portrait of Madame Pastoret): Artic
Arthur Bowen Davies (1862–1928), 5 paintings : Artic
Jordan Davies (born 1941), 1 painting : Artic
Charles Harold Davis (1856–1933), 1 painting : Artic
Ronald Davis (born 1937), 3 paintings : Artic
Stuart Davis (painter) (1894–1964), 2 paintings : Artic
Manierre Dawson (1887–1969), 2 paintings : Artic
Julio de Diego (1900–1979), 2 paintings : Artic
Jay DeFeo (1929–1989), 1 painting : Artic
Wallace Leroy DeWolf (1854–1930), 1 painting : Artic
Alexandre-Gabriel Decamps (1803–1860), 1 painting : Artic
Edgar Degas (1834–1917), 7 paintings (The Millinery Shop): Artic
Eugène Delacroix (1798–1863), 6 paintings : Artic
Beauford Delaney (1901–1979), 2 paintings : Artic
Joseph Delaney (1904–1991), 1 painting : Artic
Robert Delaunay (1885–1941), 1 painting (The Red Tower): Artic
Paul Delvaux (1897–1994), 3 paintings : Artic
Charles Demuth (1883–1935), 3 paintings : Artic
Maurice Denis (1870–1943), 1 painting : Artic
André Derain (1880–1954), 8 paintings : Artic
Marcellin Desboutin (1823–1902), 1 painting : Artic
Jean-Baptiste-Henri Deshays (1729–1765), 1 painting : Artic
Jean-Baptiste François Desoria (1758–1832), 1 painting : Artic
Paul Lucien Dessau, 1 painting : Artic
Édouard Detaille (1848–1912), 1 painting : Artic
Cesare Agostino Detti (1847–1914), 1 painting : Artic
Arthur Devis (1712–1787) (1712–1787), 4 paintings : Artic
Thomas Dewing (1851–1938), 1 painting : Artic
Narcisse Virgilio Díaz (1807–1876), 2 paintings : Artic
Imitator of Narcisse Virgilio Díaz (1807–1876), 1 painting : Artic
Edwin Dickinson (1891–1978), 1 painting : Artic
Preston Dickinson (1891–1930), 1 painting : Artic
Richard Diebenkorn (1922–1993), 1 painting : Artic
Abraham van Diepenbeeck (1596–1675), 1 painting : Artic
Burgoyne Diller (1906–1965), 1 painting : Artic
Jim Dine (born 1935), 1 painting : Artic
Theo van Doesburg (1883–1931), 1 painting : Artic
Peter Doig (born 1959), 1 painting : Artic
Kees van Dongen (1877–1968), 1 painting : Artic
Gustave Doré (1832–1883), 1 painting : Artic
Thomas Doughty (artist) (1793–1856), 2 paintings : Artic
Arthur Dove (1880–1946), 10 paintings : Artic
Arthur Wesley Dow (1857–1922), 1 painting : Artic
Moira Jane Dryer (1957–1992), 1 painting : Artic
Pieter Dubordieu (1608–1688), 1 painting : Artic
Victor Dubreuil (active 1880–1910), 1 painting : Artic
Claude-Marie Dubufe (1790–1864), 1 painting : Artic
Jean Dubuffet (1901–1985), 8 paintings : Artic
Marcel Duchamp (1887–1968), 1 painting : Artic
Suzanne Duchamp (1889–1963), 1 painting : Artic
Charles Dufresne (1876–1938), 2 paintings : Artic
Raoul Dufy (1877–1953), 1 painting : Artic
Gaspard Dughet (1615–1675), 1 painting : Artic
Marlene Dumas (born 1953), 1 painting : Artic
Carroll Dunham (born 1949), 1 painting : Dunham Artic
André Dunoyer de Segonzac (1884–1974), 2 paintings : Artic
Joseph Duplessis (1725–1802), 1 painting : Artic
Jules Dupré (1811–1889), 3 paintings : Artic
Evert Duyckinck (c. 1620 – c. 1700), 1 painting : Artic
Anthony van Dyck (1599–1641), 1 painting : Artic
Charles Gifford Dyer (1846/51–1912), 1 painting : Artic

E
Thomas Eakins (1844–1916), 3 paintings (Portrait of Mary Adeline Williams): Artic
Ralph Earl (1751–1801), 1 painting : Artic
Christian Eckart (born 1959), 1 painting : Artic
Christoffer Wilhelm Eckersberg (1783–1853), 1 painting : Artic
Cecilia Edefalk (born 1954), 1 painting : Artic
Mira Edgerly-Korzybska (1879–1954), 1 painting : Artic
Nicole Eisenman (born 1965), 1 painting : Artic
El Greco (1541–1614), 4 paintings (Saint Martin and the Beggar; Santo Domingo el Antiguo Altarpiece) : Artic
Ger van Elk (1941–2014), 1 painting : Artic
Walter Ellison (1899–1977), 1 painting : Artic
Jacopo da Empoli (c. 1554 – 1640), 1 painting : Artic
Enomoto Chikatoshi (1898–1973), 1 painting : Artic
James Ensor (1860–1949), 1 painting : Artic
Max Ernst (1891–1976), 11 paintings : Artic
Antonio Maria Esquivel (1806–1857), 1 painting : Artic
Richard Estes (born 1932), 4 paintings : Artic
Agustin Esteve y Marqués (1753–1830), 1 painting : Artic
De Scott Evans (1847–1898), 1 painting : Artic
Philip Evergood (1901–1973), 1 painting : Artic
Hans Eworth (1540–1573), 2 paintings : Artic

F
Conrad Faber von Kreuznach (c. 1500 – 1552/3), 1 painting : Artic
John Falter (1910–1982), 1 painting : Artic
Henri Fantin-Latour (1836–1904), 4 paintings : Artic
Farrukh Chela (active c.1580 – c.1604), 1 painting : Artic
Giovanni Antonio Fasolo (1530–1572), 1 painting : Artic
Thomas Fearnley (1802–1842), 1 painting : Artic
Lyonel Feininger (1871–1956), 5 paintings : Artic
Giovanni Domenico Ferretti (1692–1768), 1 painting : Artic
Felice Ficherelli (1603–1660), 1 painting : Artic
Erastus Salisbury Field (1805–1900), 1 painting : Artic
Robert Field (1769–1819), 1 painting : Artic
Julia Fish (born 1950), 7 paintings : Artic
Alvan Fisher (1792–1863), 1 painting : Artic
Vernon Fisher (born 1943), 1 painting : Artic
Louise Fishman (1939–2021), 1 painting : Artic
Paul Flandrin (1811–1902), 1 painting : Artic
William Russell Flint (1880–1969), 1 painting : Artic
Frans Floris (1519–1570), 1 painting : Artic
Jean-Louis Forain (1852–1931), 2 paintings : Artic
James Forbes, (1797–1881) 1 painting : Artic
Marià Fortuny (1838–1874), 2 paintings : Artic
Tsugouharu Foujita (1886–1968), 1 painting : Artic
Llyn Foulkes (born 1934), 1 painting : Artic
Jean-Honoré Fragonard (1732–1806), 1 painting : Artic
John F. Francis (1808–1886), 1 painting : Artic
Samuel Lewis Francis (1923–1994), 2 paintings : Artic
Helen Frankenthaler (1928–2011), 3 paintings : Artic
Wilhelm Freddie (1909–1995), 1 painting : Artic
Vincenzo di Antonio Frediani (active 1481–1505), 1 painting : Artic
Lucian Freud (1922–2011), 2 paintings : Artic
Frederick Carl Frieseke (1874–1939), 1 painting : Artic
William Powell Frith (1819–1909), 1 painting : Artic
Eugène Fromentin (1820–1876), 3 paintings : Artic
Furuyama Moromasa (18th Century), 1 painting : Artic
Henry Fuseli (1741–1825), 3 paintings : Artic
Jan Fyt (1611–1661), 1 painting : Artic

G
Thomas Gainsborough (1727–1788), 1 painting : Artic
Ellen Gallagher (born 1965), 1 painting (Untitled): Artic
Gao Yang (born 1965), 1 painting : Artic
Daniel Garber (1880–1958), 2 paintings : Artic
Domenico Gargiulo (1609/1610 – c.1675), 1 painting : Artic
Leon Gaspard (1882–1964), 1 painting : Artic
Paul Gauguin (1848–1903), 9 paintings (Mahana no atua; Merahi metua no Tehamana; The Yellow Christ): Artic
Walter Gay (1856–1937), 2 paintings : Artic
Aert de Gelder (1645–1727), 1 painting : Artic
Todros Geller (1889–1949), 1 painting : Artic
General Idea (active 1967–1994), 1 painting : Artic
Robert Genin (1884–1941), 1 painting : Artic
François Gérard (1770–1837), 1 painting : Artic
Gaylen Gerber (born 1955), 4 paintings : Artic
Théodore Géricault (1791–1824), 2 paintings : Artic
Niccolò di Pietro Gerini (active 1366 – c. 1415), 1 painting : Artic
Jean-Léon Gérôme (1824–1904), 2 paintings : Artic
Matthias Gerung (1500–1570), 1 painting : Artic
Gunther Gerzso (1915–2000), 3 paintings : Artic
Ghasi (1756–1836), 1 painting : Artic
Ridolfo Ghirlandaio (1483–1561), 1 painting : Artic
Francescuccio Ghissi (1359–1395), 1 painting : Artic
Alberto Giacometti (1901–1966), 3 paintings : Artic
Sanford Robinson Gifford (1823–1880), 4 paintings : Artic
Gim Eung-won (1855–1921), 1 painting : Artic
Roland Ginzel (1921–2021), 2 paintings : Artic
Luca Giordano (1632–1705), 1 painting : Artic
Giovanni di Paolo (1403–1482), 6 paintings : Artic
Pedro Girard (fl.1490–1500), 1 painting : Artic
Anne-Louis Girodet de Roussy-Trioson (1767–1824), 2 paintings : Artic
Girolamo da Carpi (1501–1557), 1 painting : Artic
Girolamo da Santacroce (1492–1537), 1 painting : Artic
William Glackens (1870–1938), 1 painting : Artic
Fritz Glarner (1899–1972), 1 painting : Artic
Judith Godwin (1930–2021), 1 painting : Artic
Vincent van Gogh (1853–1890), 9 paintings (Asnières;Bedroom in Arles;Cottages;Montmartre;Portraits of Vincent van Gogh;The Roulin Family;The Town Hall at Auvers): Artic
Michael Goldberg (1924–2007), 1 painting : Artic
Leon Golub (1922–2004), 5 paintings : Artic
Natalia Goncharova (1881–1962), 1 painting : Artic
Eva Gonzalès (1849–1883), 1 painting : Artic
Antonio González Velázquez (1723–1794), 1 painting : Artic
Ron Gorchov (1930–2020), 1 painting : Artic
Arshile Gorky (1904–1948), 3 paintings : Artic
Jan Gossaert (1478–1532), 1 painting : Artic
Adolph Gottlieb (1903–1974), 2 paintings : Artic
Francisco Goya (1746–1828), 11 paintings : Artic
Jan van Goyen (1596–1656), 1 painting : Artic
John D. Graham (1886–1961), 1 painting : Artic
Art Green (born 1941), 1 painting : Artic
Jean-Baptiste Greuze (1725–1805), 1 painting : Artic
Juan Gris (1887–1927), 7 paintings : Artic
Antoine-Jean Gros (1771–1835), 1 painting : Artic
Oliver Dennett Grover (1861–1927), 1 painting : Artic
Francesco Guardi (1712–1793), 4 paintings : Artic
Giovanni Antonio Guardi (1699–1760), 1 painting : Artic
Guercino (1591–1666), 1 painting : Artic
O. Louis Guglielmi (1906–1956), 1 painting : Artic
Paul Guigou (1834–1871), 1 painting : Artic
Armand Guillaumin (1841–1927), 1 painting : Artic
Philip Guston (1913–1980), 6 paintings : Artic
Seymour Joseph Guy (1824–1910), 1 painting : Artic
Robert Gwathmey (1903–1988), 1 painting : Artic

H
Walter Hahn (born 1927), 2 paintings : Artic
Frans Hals (1582–1666), 1 painting (Portrait of a Woman in a Chair): Artic
Gawen Hamilton (1697–1737), 1 painting : Artic
Richard Hamilton (artist) (1922–2021), 1 painting : Artic
Han Tianheng (born 1940), 1 painting : Artic
Philip Hanson (born 1943), 1 painting : Artic
Chester Harding (painter) (1792–1866), 1 painting : Artic
Keith Haring (1958–1990), 1 painting : Artic
William Harnett (1848–1892), 2 paintings : Artic
Robert Bartholow Harshe (1879–1938), 1 painting : Artic
Marsden Hartley (1877–1943), 10 paintings : Artic
Childe Hassam (1859–1935), 5 paintings : Artic
Richard Hawkins (born 1961), 1 painting : Artic
Charles Webster Hawthorne (1872–1930), 2 paintings : Artic
Martin Johnson Heade (1819–1904), 2 paintings : Artic
George Peter Alexander Healy (1813–1894), 1 painting : Artic
Ernest Hébert (1817–1908), 1 painting : Artic
Al Held (1928–2005), 1 painting : Artic
Jean Hélion (1904–1987), 1 painting : Artic
Jan Sanders van Hemessen (1500–1575), 1 painting : Artic
William Penhallow Henderson (1877–1943), 3 paintings : Artic
Robert Henri (1865–1929), 3 paintings : Artic
Edward Lamson Henry (1841–1919), 2 paintings : Artic
Auguste Herbin (1882–1960), 2 paintings : Artic
Eva Hesse (1936–1970), 1 painting : Artic
John Hesselius (1728–1778), 2 paintings : Artic
Jean Hey (1471–1500), 3 paintings : Artic
Thomas Hicks (painter) (1823–1890), 1 painting : Artic
William Victor Higgins (1884–1949), 1 painting : Artic
Joseph Highmore (1692–1780), 2 paintings : Artic
George Hitchcock (artist) (1850–1913), 2 paintings : Artic
Meindert Hobbema (1638–1709), 2 paintings : Artic
David Hockney (born 1937), 2 paintings : Artic
Ferdinand Hodler (1853–1918), 4 paintings : Artic
Margo Hoff (1910–2008), 1 painting : Artic
Harry Leslie Hoffman (1871–1964), 1 painting : Artic
Hans Hofmann (1880–1966), 3 paintings : Artic
Tom Holland (artist) (born 1936), 1 painting : Artic
Winslow Homer (1836–1910), 4 paintings : Artic
Samuel Dirksz van Hoogstraten (1627–1678), 1 painting : Artic
James Roy Hopkins (1877–1969), 1 painting : Artic
Edward Hopper (1882–1967), 1 painting (Nighthawks): Artic
German Horacio (1912–1972), 1 painting : Artic
Charles Howard (1899–1978), 1 painting : Artic
Thomas Hudson (painter) (1701–1779), 2 paintings : Artic
Master Hugo (1130 – c. 1150), 1 painting : Artic
Victor-Pierre Huguet (1835–1902), 1 painting : Artic
Gary Hume (born 1962), 1 painting : Artic
William Morris Hunt (1824–1879), 1 painting : Artic
Peter Hurd (1904–1984), 1 painting : Artic
Michael Hurson (1942–2007), 1 painting : Artic

I
Ike Taiga (1723–1776), 1 painting : Artic
Ikeda Keisen (1863–1932), 1 painting : Artic
Rudolph F. Ingerle (1879–1950), 1 painting : Artic
Jean-Auguste-Dominique Ingres (1780–1867), 1 painting (Portrait of Amédée de Pastoret): Artic
George Inness (1825–1894), 26 paintings : Artic
Wilson Irvine (1869–1936), 1 painting : Artic
Eugène Isabey (1803–1886), 1 painting : Artic
Adriaen Isenbrandt (1485–1551), 1 painting : Artic
Adriaen Isenbrandt (1485–1551), 1 painting : Artic
Isoda Koryūsai (1735–1790), 1 painting : Artic
Jozef Israëls (1824–1911), 1 painting : Artic
Miyoko Ito (1918–1983), 2 paintings : Artic

J
John Jackson (painter) (1778–1831), 1 painting : Artic
Marcel Janco (1895–1984), 1 painting : Artic
Heinrich Jansen (1625–1667), 1 painting : Artic
Abraham Janssens (1570–1632), 1 painting : Artic
Alexej von Jawlensky (1864–1941), 2 paintings : Artic
Alfred Jensen (1903–1981), 2 paintings : Artic
Jess (1923–2004), 1 painting : Artic
Jasper Johns (born 1930), 2 paintings : Artic
Eastman Johnson (1824–1906), 3 paintings : Artic
Joshua Johnson (c.1765 – after 1825), 1 painting : Artic
Johan Jongkind (1819–1891), 3 paintings : Artic
Jacob Jordaens (1593–1678), 1 painting : Artic

K
Kaigetsudo Doshu (active c.1715), 1 painting : Artic
Wassily Kandinsky (1866–1944), 6 paintings (Improvisation No. 30 (Cannons)) : Artic
Kano Motonobu (1476–1559), 1 painting : Artic
Morris Kantor (1896–1974), 1 painting : Artic
Georges Kars (1882–1945), 1 painting : Artic
Katsukawa Shunchô (1783 – c. 1795), 1 painting : Artic
Katsukawa Shunshō (1726–1793), 5 paintings : Artic
Katsushika Hokusai (1760–1849), 1 painting : Artic
Alex Katz (born 1927), 1 painting : Artic
Angelica Kauffman (1741–1807), 1 painting : Artic
On Kawara (1932–2014), 1 painting : Artic
Imao Keinen (1845–1924), 1 painting : Artic
Ellsworth Kelly (1923–2015), 13 paintings : Artic
John Frederick Kensett (1816–1872), 2 paintings : Artic
Rockwell Kent (1882–1971), 1 painting : Artic
William Kentridge (born 1955), 1 painting : Artic
Anselm Kiefer (born 1945), 1 painting : Artic
Byron Kim (born 1961), 1 painting : Artic
Ernst Ludwig Kirchner (1880–1938), 1 painting : Artic
Kishi Ganku (1749–1839), 1 painting : Artic
Kitao Masanobu (1761–1816), 1 painting : Artic
Paul Klee (1879–1940), 13 paintings : Artic
Franz Kline (1910–1962), 1 painting : Artic
Kō Fuyō (1722–1784), 1 painting : Artic
Johann Koerbecke (c. 1420 – 1490), 1 painting : Artic
Oskar Kokoschka (1886–1980), 1 painting : Artic
Kong Baiji (1932–2018), 1 painting : Artic
Willem de Kooning (1904–1997), 3 paintings : Artic
John Lewis Krimmel (1786–1821), 1 painting : Artic
Leon Kroll (1884–1974), 2 paintings : Artic
Nicholas Krushenick (1929–1999), 1 painting : Artic
Walt Kuhn (1877–1949), 1 painting : Artic
Guillermo Kuitca (born 1961), 2 paintings : Artic
Leopold Kupelwieser (1796–1862), 1 painting : Artic
František Kupka (1871–1957), 1 painting : Artic
Yayoi Kusama (born 1929), 1 painting : Artic

L
John LaFarge (1835–1910), 1 painting : Artic
Laurent de La Hyre (1605–1656), 1 painting : Artic
Gaston La Touche (1854–1913), 1 painting : Artic
Pietro Labruzzi (1739–1805), 1 painting : Artic
Wifredo Lam (1902–1982), 1 painting : Artic
Lan Ying (c. 1585 – 1664), 10 paintings : Artic
Nicolas Lancret (1690–1743), 1 painting : Artic
Ronnie Landfield (born 1947), 1 painting : Artic
Edwin Henry Landseer (1802–1873), 2 paintings : Artic
Ellen Lanyon (1926–2013), 3 paintings : Artic
Nicolas de Largillière (1656–1746), 1 painting : Artic
Elie Lascaux (1888–1969), 1 painting : Artic
Marie Laurencin (1883–1956), 1 painting : Artic
Charles B. Lawrence (1790–1864), 1 painting : Artic
Jacob Lawrence (1917–2000), 1 painting : Artic
Thomas Lawrence (1769–1830), 3 paintings : Artic
Ernest Lawson (1873–1939), 1 painting : Artic
Le Corbusier (1887–1965), 3 paintings : Artic
Henri Le Sidaner (1862–1939), 2 paintings : Artic
Eustache Le Sueur (1616–1655), 1 painting : Artic
James Lechay (1907–2001), 1 painting : Artic
Judy Ledgerwood (born 1959), 1 painting : Artic
Doris Lee (1905–1983), 1 painting : Artic
Hughie Lee-Smith (1915–1999), 1 painting : Artic
Jules Joseph Lefebvre (1836–1912), 1 painting : Artic
Fernand Léger (1881–1955), 8 paintings : Artic
Adriaan de Lelie (1755–1820), 1 painting : Artic
Annette Lemieux (born 1957), 1 painting : Artic
Georges Lemmen (1865–1916), 1 painting : Artic
Franz von Lenbach (1836–1904), 1 painting : Artic
Leng Mei (active 1677–1742), 1 painting : Artic
Fuchs Leonhart (16th Century), 1 painting : Artic
Stanislas Lépine (1835–1892), 4 paintings : Artic
Julian Edwin Levi (1900–1982), 1 painting : Artic
Jack Levine (1915–2010), 1 painting : Artic
Sherrie Levine (born 1947), 1 painting : Artic
Henri-Léopold Lévy (1840–1904), 1 painting : Artic
Sol LeWitt (1928–2007, 1 painting : Artic
Lucas van Leyden (1494–1533), 1 painting : Artic
Léon Augustin Lhermitte (1844–1925), 1 painting : Artic
André Lhote (1885–1962), 3 paintings : Artic
Li Huasheng (1944–2018), 1 painting : Artic
Li Huayi (born 1948), 2 paintings : Artic
Li Xubai (born 1940), 1 painting : Artic
Roy Lichtenstein (1923–1997), 3 paintings : Artic
Jonas Lie (painter) (1880–1940), 1 painting : Artic
Jan Lievens (1607–1674), 1 painting : Artic
Glenn Ligon (born 1960), 1 painting : Artic
Lin Xue (born 1968), 1 painting : Artic
Richard Lindner (painter) (1901–1978), 1 painting : Artic
Dirck van der Lisse (1607–1669), 1 painting : Artic
Luigi Loir (1845–1916), 1 painting : Artic
Gustave Loiseau (1865–1935), 2 paintings : Artic
Alessandro Longhi (1733–1813), 1 painting : Artic
Pietro Longhi (1702–1783), 2 paintings : Artic
Empress Dowager of China Longyu, 1 painting : Artic
Andrés López Polanco (died 1641), 1 painting : Artic
Claude Lorrain (1604–1682), 1 painting : Artic
Robert Lostutter (born 1939), 3 paintings : Artic
Johann Carl Loth (1632–1698), 1 painting : Artic
Morris Louis (1912–1962), 2 paintings : Artic
Philip James de Loutherbourg (1740–1812), 1 painting : Artic
Richard Maris Loving (1924–2021), 2 paintings : Artic
Will Hicok Low (1853–1933), 5 paintings : Artic
Lu Wei (born 1970), 1 painting : Artic
Lu Zhi (c. 1496 – 1576), 1 painting : Artic
George Luks (1867–1933), 1 painting : Artic
Fernand Lungren (1857–1932), 1 painting : Artic
Jean Lurçat (1892–1966), 2 paintings : Artic
Jim Lutes (born 1955), 1 painting : Artic

M
Walter MacEwen (1860–1943), 1 painting : Artic
Loren MacIver (1909–1998), 1 painting : Artic
Frederick William MacMonnies (1863–1937), 1 painting : Artic
Nicolaes Maes (1634–1693), 2 paintings : Artic
Alessandro Magnasco (1667–1749), 2 paintings : Artic
René Magritte (1898–1967), 4 paintings (On the Threshold of Liberty; Time Transfixed):  Artic
Hans Makart (1840–1884), 1 painting : Artic
Edward Greene Malbone, 1 painting : Artic
Kazimir Malevich (1878–1935), 1 painting : Artic
Man Ray (1890–1976), 3 paintings : Artic
Cornelis de Man (1621–1706), 1 painting : Artic
Antonio Mancini (1852–1930), 1 painting : Artic
Édouard Manet (1832–1883), 10 paintings (The Races at Longchamp): Artic
Bartolomeo Manfredi (1582–1622), 1 painting : Artic
Robert Mangold (born 1937), 2 paintings : Artic
Peppino Mangravite (1896–1978), 1 painting : Artic
Margherita Manzelli (born 1968), 1 painting : Artic
Piero Manzoni (1933–1963), 1 painting : Artic
Franz Marc (1880–1916), 1 painting : Artic
Conrad Marca-Relli (1913–2000), 1 painting : Artic
Émile van Marcke (1827–1890), 1 painting : Artic
Louis Marcoussis (1878/1883–1941), 2 paintings : Artic
Brice Marden (born 1938), 2 paintings : Artic
Pietro Marescalchi (1522–1589), 1 painting : Artic
Michele Marieschi (1710–1743), 1 painting : Artic
John Marin (1870–1953), 1 painting : Artic
Albert Marquet (1875–1947), 2 paintings : Artic
Reginald Marsh (artist) (1898–1954), 2 paintings : Artic
Benjamin Marshall (1768–1835), 1 painting : Artic
Kerry James Marshall (born 1955), 6 paintings : Artic
Agnes Martin (1912–2004), 1 painting : Artic
Homer Dodge Martin (1836–1897), 1 painting : Artic
John Martin (painter) (1789–1854), 1 painting : Artic
Bernat Martorell (ca. 1400–1452), 1 painting : Artic
Martyl Suzanne Langsdorf (1917–2013), 2 paintings : Artic
Maryan (Pinchas Burstein) (1927–1977), 1 painting : Artic
André Masson (1896–1987), 1 painting : Artic
Quentin Massys (1466–1530), 1 painting : Artic
Master Alejo, 1 painting : Artic
Master Palanquinos, 1 painting : Artic
Master of Apollo and Daphne (c. 1480 – 1510), 2 paintings : Artic
Master of Riglos (active 1435–1460), 1 painting : Artic
Master of Saint Veronica (1400–1420), 1 painting : Artic
Master of the 1540s (1541–1551), 1 painting : Artic
Master of the Bigallo Crucifix (fl.1215/20–1265), 1 painting : Artic
Master of the Female Half-Lengths (1530–1540), 1 painting : Artic
Master of the Freising Visitation, 1 painting : Artic
Master of the Historia Friderici et Maximiliani, 1 painting : Artic
Master of the Visitation, 1 painting : Artic
Master of the Worcester Panel, 1 painting : Artic
Agostino Masucci (1691–1758), 1 painting : Artic
Georges Mathieu, 1 painting : Artic
Henri Matisse (1869–1954), 10 paintings : Artic
Roberto Matta (1911–2002), 6 paintings : Artic
Matteo di Giovanni (c. 1430 – 1495), 2 paintings : Artic
Jan Matulka (1890–1972), 1 painting : Artic
Maxime Maufra (1861–1918), 1 painting : Artic
Constant Mayer (1829–1911), 1 painting : Artic
Gerald McLaughlin, 2 paintings : Artic
John McLaughlin (artist) (1898–1976), 1 painting : Artic
Mei Chong (17th Century), 1 painting : Artic
Ludwig Meidner (1884–1966), 1 painting : Artic
Jean-Louis-Ernest Meissonier (1815–1891), 1 painting : Artic
Gari Melchers (1860–1932), 2 paintings : Artic
Meliore di Jacopo (fl.1255–1285), 1 painting : Artic
Hans Memling (1430–1494), 2 paintings : Artic
Anton Raphael Mengs (1728–1779), 2 paintings : Artic
Herman Menzel (1904–1988), 1 painting : Artic
Mario Merz (1925–2003), 1 painting : Artic
Sam Messer (born 1955), 1 painting : Artic
Willard Metcalf (1858–1925), 1 painting : Artic
Jean Metzinger (1883–1956), 4 paintings (Woman with a Fan): Artic
Charles Alfred Meurer (1865–1955), 1 painting : Artic
Georges Michel (painter) (1763–1843), 1 painting : Artic
Michele Tosini (1503–1577), 1 painting : Artic
Francesco Paolo Michetti (1851–1929), 1 painting : Artic
Willem van Mieris (1662–1747), 1 painting : Artic
Mihata Jôryû (fl.early 19th Century), 1 painting : Artic
Johannes Mytens (1614–1670), 1 painting : Artic
Manolo Millares (1926–1972), 1 painting : Artic
Richard Emil Miller (1875–1943), 1 painting : Artic
Jean-François Millet (1814–1875), 9 paintings : Artic
Joan Miró (1893–1983), 9 paintings (Ciphers and Constellations, in Love with a Woman): Artic
Joan Mitchell (1925–1992), 1 painting : Artic
Miyagawa Chôshun, 1 painting : Artic
Amedeo Modigliani (1884–1920), 3 paintings (Jacques and Berthe Lipchitz): Artic
László Moholy-Nagy (1895–1946), 2 paintings : Artic
Louise Moillon (1609–1696), 1 painting : Artic
Antonio Molleno (?–1845), 1 painting : Artic
Joos de Momper (1564–1635), 3 paintings : Artic
Lorenzo Monaco (1370–1423), 1 painting : Artic
Piet Mondrian (1872–1944), 3 paintings : Artic
Claude Monet (1840–1926), 33 paintings (Arrival of the Normandy Train, Gare Saint-Lazare; Charing Cross Bridge; Haystacks; The Cliff Walk at Pourville;Water Lilies): Artic
Adolphe Joseph Thomas Monticelli (1824–1886), 7 paintings : Artic
Antonis Mor (1520–1576), 2 paintings : Artic
Giorgio Morandi (1890–1964), 1 painting : Artic
Gustave Moreau (1826–1898), 1 painting : Artic
Paulus Moreelse (1571–1638), 1 painting : Artic
Domenico Morelli (1823–1901), 1 painting : Artic
Moretto da Brescia (c. 1498 – 1554), 1 painting : Artic
Aleksei Morgunov (1884–1935), 1 painting : Artic
Berthe Morisot (1841–1895), 4 paintings : Artic
George Morland (1763–1804), 1 painting : Artic
Giovanni Battista Moroni (1525–1578), 1 painting : Artic
George Lovett Kingsland Morris (1905–1975), 1 painting : Artic
Keith Morrison (born 1942), 1 painting : Artic
Edward Moses (1926–2018), 2 paintings : Artic
Grandma Moses (1860–1961), 1 painting : Artic
Robert Motherwell (1915–1991), 1 painting : Artic
Archibald Motley (1891–1981), 2 paintings : Artic
Shepard Alonzo Mount (1804–1868), 1 painting : Artic
William Sidney Mount (1807–1868), 1 painting : Artic
George Ludwig Mueller (born 1929), 2 paintings : Artic
Mughal, 19 paintings : Artic
Charles Louis Muller (1815–1892), 1 painting : Artic
Edvard Munch (1863–1944), 1 painting : Artic
Gabriele Münter (1877–1962), 1 painting : Artic
Francesco de Mura (1696–1782), 1 painting : Artic
Bartolomé Esteban Murillo (1617–1682), 1 painting : Artic
Hermann Dudley Murphy (1867–1945), 1 painting : Artic
Elizabeth Murray (artist) (1940–2007), 1 painting : Artic
Jerome Myers (1867–1940), 1 painting : Artic

N
Nakamura Daizaburō (1898–1947), 1 painting : Artic
John Neagle (1796–1865), 1 painting : Artic
David Dalhoff Neal (1838–1915), 1 painting : Artic
Alice Neel (1900–1984), 1 painting : Artic
Eglon van der Neer (1634–1703), 1 painting : Artic
Caspar Netscher (1639–1684), 2 paintings : Artic
Barnett Newman (1905–1970), 2 paintings : Artic
Ben Nicholson (1894–1982), 3 paintings : Artic
Gladys Nilsson (born 1940), 1 painting : Artic
Noguchi Shohin (1847–1917), 1 painting : Artic
Isamu Noguchi (1904–1988), 1 painting : Artic
Kenneth Noland (1924–2010), 4 paintings : Artic
Emil Nolde (1867–1956), 2 paintings : Artic
James Northcote (1746–1831), 1 painting : Artic
John Warner Norton (1876–1934), 1 painting : Artic
Jim Nutt (born 1938), 2 paintings : Artic
Allegretto Nuzi (c. 1315 – 1373), 1 painting : Artic
Arvid Nyholm (1866–1927), 1 painting : Artic

O
Georgia O'Keeffe (1887–1986), 19 paintings (Blue and Green Music): Artic
Jacob Ochtervelt (1634–1682), 1 painting : Artic
Ogata Korin (1658–1716), 1 painting : Artic
Kenzo Okada (1902–1982), 1 painting : Artic
Ôkura Jirô (1942–2014), 1 painting : Artic
Jules Olitski (1922–2007), 2 paintings : Artic
Omura Koyo (1891–1983), 1 painting : Artic
Marcel Ordinaire (1848–1896), 1 painting : Artic
Bernard van Orley (1490–1541), 1 painting : Artic
José Clemente Orozco (1883–1949), 1 painting : Artic
Adriaen van Ostade (1610–1685), 1 painting : Artic
Jean-Baptiste Oudry (1686–1755), 1 painting : Artic
Laura Owens (born 1970), 1 painting : Artic
Amédée Ozenfant (1886–1966), 1 painting : Artic

P
Franz Xaver Palko (1724–1767), 1 painting : Artic
Palma il Giovane (1546–1628), 1 painting : Artic
Paolo Veneziano (before 1300 – ca 1360), 2 paintings : Artic
Joseph Parker (1930–2009), 1 painting : Artic
Ray Parker (1922–1990), 1 painting : Artic
Ed Paschke (1939–2004), 4 paintings : Artic
Pascin (1885–1930), 2 paintings : Artic
Alberto Pasini (1826–1899), 1 painting : Artic
Jean-Baptiste Pater (1695–1736), 1 painting : Artic
Joachim Patinir (c. 1480 – 1524), 1 painting : Artic
Anna Claypoole Peale (1791–1878), 1 painting : Artic
Charles Willson Peale (1741–1827), 2 paintings : Artic
James Peale (1749–1831), 1 painting :  Artic
Raphaelle Peale (1774–1825), 1 painting : Artic
Rembrandt Peale (1778–1860), 2 paintings : Artic
Philip Pearlstein (1924–2022), 1 painting : Artic
Max Pechstein (1881–1955), 1 painting : Artic
Sheldon Peck (1797–1868), 2 paintings : Artic
John Ritto Penniman (1782–1841), 1 painting : Artic
Irene Rice Pereira (1902–1971), 1 painting : Artic
Léon Bazille Perrault (1832–1908), 1 painting : Artic
Pietro Perugino (1446–1523), 4 paintings : Artic
Jean-Baptiste Pater (1695–1736), 1 painting : Artic
Irving Petlin (1934–2018), 3 paintings : Artic
John Frederick Peto (1854–1907), 1 painting : Artic
Ernest Christian Frederik Petzholdt (1805–1838), 1 painting : Artic
Frank Charles Peyraud (1856/58–1948), 1 painting : Artic
Ammi Phillips (1788–1865), 2 paintings : Artic
Francis Piatek (born 1944), 2 paintings : Artic
Giovanni Battista Piazzetta (1682–1754), 2 paintings : Artic
Francis Picabia (1879–1953), 3 paintings : Artic
Pablo Picasso (1881–1973), 17 paintings (Portrait of Daniel-Henry Kahnweiler; The Old Guitarist): Artic
Piero di Cosimo (1462–1521), 1 painting : Artic
Evert Pieters (1856–1932), 1 painting : Artic
Horace Pippin (1888–1946), 1 painting : Artic
Camille Pissarro (1830–1903), 11 paintings : Artic
Lari Pittman (born 1952), 1 painting : Artic
Angel Planells (1901–1989), 1 painting : Artic
Johann Georg Platzer (1704–1761), 2 paintings : Artic
Sylvia Plimack Mangold (born 1938), 1 painting : Artic
Serge Poliakoff (1906–1969), 1 painting : Artic
Sigmar Polke (1941–2012), 1 painting : Artic
Jackson Pollock (1912–1956), 3 paintings : Artic
Pontormo (1494–1556), 1 painting : Artic
Abram Poole (1882/83–1961), 1 painting : Artic
Larry Poons (born 1937), 4 paintings : Artic
Paulus Potter (1625–1654), 1 painting : Artic
Edward Henry Potthast (1857–1927), 1 painting : Artic
Frans Pourbus the younger (1569–1622), 1 painting : Artic
Nicolas Poussin (1594–1665), 1 painting : Artic
Sir Edward Poynter, 1st Baronet (1836–1919), 2 paintings : Artic
Stefano Pozzi (1699–1768), 3 paintings : Artic
Charles Poerson (1609–1667), 1 painting : Artic
Charles Prendergast (1863–1948), 1 painting : Artic
Gregorio Prestopino (1907–1984), 1 painting : Artic
Mattia Preti (1613–1699), 1 painting : Artic
William Matthew Prior (1806–1873), 2 paintings : Artic
Giulio Cesare Procaccini (1574–1625), 1 painting : Artic
Pierre-Paul Prud'hon (1758–1823), 1 painting : Artic
Pedro Pruna (1904–1977), 1 painting : Artic
James Ferrier Pryde (1866–1941), 1 painting : Artic
Antonio Puga (1602–1648), 1 painting : Artic
Pierre Puvis de Chavannes (1824–1898), 3 paintings : Artic

Q
Qian Daxin (1728–1804), 1 painting : Artic
Qiu Ying (1494–1557), 1 painting : Artic
John Quidor (1801–1881), 1 painting : Artic

R
Henry Raeburn (1756–1823), 3 paintings : Artic
Michael Raedecker (born 1963), 1 painting : Artic
Joseph Raffael (1933–2021), 2 paintings : Artic
Jean-François Raffaëlli (1850–1924), 2 paintings : Artic
John Ramage (c. 1748 – 1802), 1 painting : Artic
Christina Ramberg (1946–1995), 3 paintings : Artic
Henry Ward Ranger (1858–1916), 1 painting : Artic
John Rathbone (1750–1807), 2 paintings : Artic
Abraham Rattner (1893–1978), 1 painting : Artic
Robert Rauschenberg (1925–2008), 1 painting : Artic
Carducius Plantagenet Ream (1838–1917), 1 painting : Artic
Edward Willis Redfield (1869–1965), 1 painting : Artic
Odilon Redon (1840–1916), 3 paintings : Artic
Henri Regnault (1843–1871), 2 paintings : Artic
Jean-Baptiste Regnault (1754–1829), 1 painting : Artic
Ad Reinhardt (1913–1967), 2 paintings : Artic
Heinrich Reinhold (1788–1825), 1 painting : Artic
Deborah Remington (1930–2010), 1 painting : Artic
Frederic Remington (1861–1909), 17 paintings : Artic
Ren Yi (1840–1896), 8 paintings : Artic
Guido Reni (1575–1642), 1 painting : Artic
Pierre-Auguste Renoir (1841–1919), 15 paintings (Lunch at the Restaurant Fournaise;Two Sisters (On the Terrace)) : Artic
Jean Restout (1692–1768), 1 painting : Artic
Joshua Reynolds (1723–1792), 2 paintings : Artic
Jusepe de Ribera (1590–1656), 1 painting : Artic
Augustin Théodule Ribot (1823–1891), 2 paintings : Artic
Sebastiano Ricci (1659–1734), 1 painting : Artic
William Trost Richards (1833–1905), 1 painting : Artic
Jonathan Richardson (1667–1745), 1 painting : Artic
Adrian Ludwig Richter (1803–1884), 1 painting : Artic
Gerhard Richter (born 1932), 12 paintings : Artic
Martín Rico y Ortega (1833–1908), 1 painting : Artic
Rembrandt (1606–1669), 1 painting (Old Man with a Gold Chain) : Artic
Bridget Riley (born 1931), 1 painting : Artic
Antonio Rimpatta (fl.1500–1530), 1 painting : Artic
Jean-Paul Riopelle (1923–2002), 2 paintings : Artic
Diego Rivera (1886–1957), 3 paintings : Artic
Larry Rivers (1923–2002), 1 painting : Artic
Hubert Robert (1733–1808), 4 paintings : Artic
Ercole de' Roberti (1450–1469), 1 painting : Artic
Theodore Robinson (1852–1896), 1 painting : Artic
Severin Roesen (1848–1872), 1 painting : Artic
Pieter Gerritsz van Roestraten (1630–1700), 1 painting : Artic
Giovanni Romagnoli (1893–1976), 1 painting : Artic
George Romney (1734–1802), 1 painting : Artic
Salvator Rosa (1615–1673), 2 paintings : Artic
Kay Rosen (born 1944), 7 paintings : Artic
James Rosenquist (1933–2017), 1 painting : Artic
Toby Edward Rosenthal (1848–1917), 1 painting : Artic
Seymour Rosofsky (1924–1981), 3 paintings : Artic
Dante Gabriel Rossetti (1828–1882), 1 painting (Beata Beatrix): Artic
Barbara Rossi (born 1940), 2 paintings : Artic
Mark Rothko (1903–1970), 3 paintings : Artic
Johann Michael Rottmayr (1656–1730), 5 paintings : Artic
Georges Rouault (1871–1958), 5 paintings : Artic
Henri Rousseau (1844–1910), 3 paintings : Artic
Théodore Rousseau (1812–1867), 5 paintings : Artic
Ker Xavier Roussel (1867–1944), 1 painting : Artic
Pierre Roy (1880–1959), 1 painting : Artic
Peter Paul Rubens (1577–1640), 7 paintings : Artic
Jacob Isaacksz van Ruisdael (1628–1682), 1 painting : Artic
Edward Ruscha (born 1937), 2 paintings : Artic
Hesheli Rushan (active 1850–1899), 1 painting : Artic
John Russell (painter) (1745–1806), 1 painting : Artic
Albert Pinkham Ryder (1847–1917), 1 painting : Artic
Robert Ryman (1930–2019), 5 paintings : Artic

S
Cornelis Saftleven (1607–1681), 1 painting : Artic
Kay Sage (1898–1963), 1 painting : Artic
David Salle (born 1952), 1 painting : Artic
Bartolommeo Salvestrini (died 1630), 1 painting : Artic
Alonso Sánchez Coello (1531–1588), 1 painting : Artic
Juan Sánchez Cotán (c. 1560 – 1627), 1 painting : Artic
Sano di Pietro (1405/1406–1481), 1 painting : Artic
Jean-Baptiste Santerre (1658–1717), 1 painting : Artic
John Singer Sargent (1856–1925), 13 paintings : Artic
Paul Sarkisian (1928–2019), 1 painting : Artic
Andrea del Sarto (1486–1530), 1 painting : Artic
Peter Saul (born 1934), 1 painting : Artic
Edward Savage (artist) (1761–1817), 1 painting : Artic
Girolamo Savoldo (c. 1480 – c. 1548), 1 painting : Artic
Martin Schaffner (1477/78–1549), 1 painting : Artic
Ary Scheffer (1795–1858), 1 painting : Artic
Albert Schindler (1805–1861), 1 painting : Artic
Karl Schmidt-Rottluff (1884–1976), 1 painting : Artic
Julian Schnabel (born 1951), 1 painting : Artic
Walter Elmer Schofield (1866–1944), 2 paintings : Artic
Adolf Schreyer (1828–1899), 2 paintings : Artic
William Samuel Schwartz (1896–1977), 1 painting : Artic
Jan van Scorel (1495–1562), 2 paintings : Artic
Sean Scully (born 1945), 2 paintings : Artic
Kurt Seligmann, 9 paintings : Artic
Paul Sérusier (1864–1927), 1 painting : Artic
Sesson Shukei (1504 – c. 1589), 1 painting : Artic
Georges Seurat (1859–1891), 3 paintings (A Sunday Afternoon on the Island of La Grande Jatte): Artic
Gino Severini (1883–1966), 3 paintings : Artic
Leopold Gould Seyffert (1887–1956), 1 painting : Artic
Ben Shahn (1898–1969), 1 painting : Artic
Shao Yixuan (1886–1954), 1 painting : Artic
Charles Green Shaw (1892–1974), 2 paintings : Artic
Joshua Shaw (1776–1861), 1 painting : Artic
Charles Sheeler (1883–1965), 2 paintings : Artic
Shen Kai (active 18th Century), 1 painting : Artic
Shen Yongling (1614–1698), 1 painting : Artic
Shen Zhou (1427–1509), 1 painting : Artic
Shibata Zeshin (1807–1891), 1 painting : Artic
Mandara Shika (15th Century), 1 painting : Artic
Everett Shinn (1876–1953), 1 painting : Artic
Kazuo Shiraga (1924–2008), 1 painting : Artic
Walter Shirlaw (1838–1909), 1 painting : Artic
Morita Shiryū (1912–1998), 1 painting : Artic
Paul Signac (1863–1935), 1 painting : Artic
Amy Sillman (born 1954), 1 painting : Artic
Lucien Simon (born 1961), 1 painting : Artic
John Philip Simpson (1782–1847), 1 painting (The Captive Slave): Artic
David Alfaro Siqueiros (1896–1974), 1 painting : Artic
Mario Sironi (1885–1961), 1 painting : Artic
Alfred Sisley (1839–1899), 6 paintings : Artic
Hannah Brown Skeele (1829–1901), 1 painting : Artic
John French Sloan (1871–1951), 1 painting : Artic
John Smybert (1688–1751), 2 paintings : Artic
Kimber Smith (1922–1981), 1 painting : Artic
Frans Snyders (1579–1657), 1 painting : Artic
Gerard Soest (1600–1681), 1 painting : Artic
Harald Sohlberg (1877–1935), 1 painting : Artic
Francesco Solimena (1657–1743), 3 paintings : Artic
Alan Sonfist (born 1946), 5 paintings : Artic
Martín de Soria (fl. (1449–1487), 2 paintings : Artic
Joaquín Sorolla (1863–1923), 3 paintings : Artic
Oguri Sôtan (1413–1481), 1 painting : Artic
Pierre Soulages (1919–2022), 2 paintings : Artic
Chaïm Soutine (1893–1943), 2 paintings : Artic
Amadeo de Souza Cardoso (1887–1918), 3 paintings : Artic
Hasegawa Soya (1590–1667), 1 painting : Artic
Lo Spagna (died 1529), 1 painting : Artic
Elizabeth Sparhawk-Jones (1885–1968), 2 paintings : Artic
Eugene Speicher (1883–1962), 1 painting : Artic
Adriaen van der Spelt (1632–1673), 1 painting : Artic
Frederick Randolph Spencer (1806–1875), 1 painting : Artic
Robert Spencer (1879–1931), 1 painting : Artic
Spinello Aretino (1330–1410), 1 painting : Artic
Theodore Stamos (1922–1997), 1 painting : Artic
Gherardo Starnina (1354–1409), 1 painting : Artic
Evelyn Statsinger (1927–2016), 1 painting : Artic
Nicolas de Staël (1914–1955), 1 painting : Artic
Jan Steen (1626–1679), 1 painting : Artic
Hendrik van Steenwijk II (1580–1649), 1 painting : Artic
Frank Stella (born 1936), 3 paintings : Artic
Joseph Stella (1877–1946), 3 paintings : Artic
Veronica Stern (1717–1801), 2 paintings : Artic
Hedda Sterne (1910–2011), 1 painting : Artic
Florine Stettheimer (1871–1944), 1 painting : Artic
Alfred Stevens (sculptor) (1817–1875), 1 painting : Artic
Nelson Stevens (born 1938), 1 painting : Artic
Clyfford Still (1904–1980), 2 paintings : Artic
Rudolf Stingel (born 1956), 1 painting : Artic
Mathias Stoltenberg (1799–1871), 1 painting : Artic
Bernardo Strozzi (1581–1644), 1 painting : Artic
Gilbert Stuart (1755–1828), 1 painting : Artic
Su Liupeng (1701–1862), 1 painting : Artic
Robert Matthew Sully (1803–1855), 1 painting : Artic
Thomas Sully (1783–1872), 3 paintings : Artic
Léopold Survage (1879–1968), 5 paintings : Artic
Suzuki Kiitsu (1796–1858), 1 painting : Artic
George Gardner Symons (1861–1930), 1 painting : Artic

T
Tawaraya Sōtatsu (c. 1570 – c. 1640), 1 painting : Artic
T'ang Haywen (1927–1991), 2 paintings : Artic
Taddeo di Bartolo (1362–1422), 1 painting : Artic
Rufino Tamayo (1899–1991), 3 paintings : Artic
Reizei Tamechika (1823–1864), 1 painting : Artic
Tang Haiwen (1929–1991), 1 painting : Artic
Tang Yin (1470–1524), 1 painting : Artic
Yves Tanguy (1900–1955), 3 paintings : Artic
Henry Ossawa Tanner (1859–1937), 1 painting : Artic
Tony Tasset (born 1960), 1 painting : Artic
Pavel Tchelitchew (1898–1957), 1 painting : Artic
Pieter Mulier II (1637–1701), 1 painting : Artic
David Teniers the Younger (1610–1690), 4 paintings : Artic
Gerard ter Borch (1617–1681), 1 painting : Artic
Hendrick ter Brugghen (1588–1629), 1 painting (The Denial of Saint Peter): Artic
Abbott Handerson Thayer (1849–1921), 1 painting : Artic
Wayne Thiebaud (1920–2021), 1 painting : Artic
Hans Thoma (1839–1924), 1 painting : Artic
Alma Thomas (1891–1978), 1 painting : Artic
Bob Thompson (1937–1966), 4 paintings : Artic
Harry Thompson (?–1901), 1 painting : Artic
William John Thomson (1771–1845), 1 painting : Artic
Giovanni Battista Tiepolo (1696–1770), 5 paintings : Artic
Giovanni Domenico Tiepolo (1727–1804), 1 painting : Artic
Tintoretto (1518–1594), 2 paintings : Artic
Domenico Tintoretto (1560–1635), 1 painting : Artic
Titian (1485–1576), 1 painting : Artic
Mark Tobey (1890–1976), 2 paintings : Artic
Fred Tomaselli (born 1956), 1 painting : Artic
Torii Kiyonobu I (c. 1664 – 1729), 1 painting : Artic
Toriyama Sekien (1712–1788), 1 painting : Artic
Helen Torr (1886–1967), 1 painting : Artic
Tosa Mitsuoki (1617–1691), 2 paintings : Artic
Henri de Toulouse-Lautrec (1864–1901), 6 paintings (At the Moulin Rouge): Artic
Paul Trebilcock (1902–1981), 1 painting : Artic
Pierre-Charles Trémolières (1703–1739), 1 painting : Artic
Francesco Trevisani (1656–1746), 1 painting : Artic
Benjamin Trott (ca. 1770–1843), 1 painting : Artic
Constant Troyon (1810–1865), 4 paintings : Artic
John Trumbull (1756–1843), 1 painting : Artic
Cosimo Tura (c. 1430 – 1495), 1 painting : Artic
Alessandro Turchi (1578–1649), 1 painting : Artic
J. M. W. Turner (1775–1851), 2 paintings : Artic
Richard Tuttle (born 1941), 1 painting : Artic
Luc Tuymans (born 1958), 3 paintings : Artic
John Henry Twachtman (1853–1902), 2 paintings : Artic
Cy Twombly (1928–2011), 2 paintings : Artic
Jack Tworkov (1900–1982), 1 painting : Artic
Tôsendô Rifû (active c. 1730), 1 painting : Artic

U
Günther Uecker (born 1930), 1 painting : Artic
Walter Ufer (1876–1936), 2 paintings : Artic
Ugolino di Nerio (1295–1347), 1 painting : Artic
Utagawa Hiroshige (1797–1858), 1 painting : Artic
Utagawa Toyohiro (1773–1828), 1 painting : Artic
Maurice Utrillo (1883–1955), 2 paintings : Artic

V
Pierre-Henri de Valenciennes (1750–1819), 2 paintings : Artic
DeWain Valentine (1936–2022), 1 painting : Artic
Félix Vallotton (1865–1925), 2 paintings : Artic
Georges Vantongerloo (1886–1965), 1 painting : Artic
Victor Vasarely (1908–1997), 1 painting : Artic
Giorgio Vasari (1511–1574), 1 painting : Artic
Pietro della Vecchia (1603–1678), 1 painting : Artic
Elihu Vedder (1836–1923), 3 paintings : Artic
Otto van Veen (1556–1629), 1 painting : Artic
Adriaen van de Velde (1636–1672), 1 painting : Artic
Diego Velázquez (1599–1660), 1 painting (The Kitchen Maid): Artic
Claude Venard (1913–1999), 2 paintings : Artic
Raphael Vergos (fl.1492–1501), 2 paintings : Artic
Claude Joseph Vernet (1714–1789), 1 painting : Artic
Paolo Veronese (1528–1588), 1 painting : Artic
Maria Elena Vieira da Silva (1908–1992), 2 paintings : Artic
Jacques Villon (1875–1963), 3 paintings : Artic
Antonio Vivarini (1415–1476), 1 painting : Artic
Maurice de Vlaminck (1876–1958), 3 paintings : Artic
Pierre-Jacques Volaire (1729–1792?), 1 painting : Artic
Robert Vonnoh (1858–1933), 1 painting : Artic
Édouard Vuillard (1868–1940), 10 paintings : Artic

W
Ferdinand Georg Waldmüller (1793–1865), 1 painting : Artic
Samuel Lovett Waldo (1783–1861), 3 paintings : Artic
Wang Ning (fl.19th Century), 1 painting : Artic
Andy Warhol (1928–1987), 2 paintings : Artic
Jean-Antoine Watteau (1684–1721), 2 paintings : Artic
George Frederic Watts (1817–1904), 2 paintings : Artic
Frederick Judd Waugh (1861–1940), 1 painting : Artic
Max Weber (1881–1961), 1 painting : Artic
Jan Baptist Weenix (1621–1661), 1 painting : Artic
Lawrence Weiner (1942–2021), 1 painting : Artic
J. Alden Weir (1852–1919), 1 painting : Artic
Neil Welliver (1929–2005), 1 painting : Artic
Wen Zhengming (1470–1559), 1 painting : Artic
William Wendt (1865–1946), 1 painting : Artic
Tom Wesselmann (1931–2004), 1 painting : Wesselmann Artic
Benjamin West (1738–1820), 4 paintings : Artic
Rogier van der Weyden (1400–1464), 2 paintings : Artic
Rogier van der Weyden (1400–1464), 1 painting : Artic
Margaret Wharton (1943–2014), 2 paintings : Artic
James Abbott McNeill Whistler (1834–1903), 10 paintings : Artic
Thomas Whitcombe (c. 1752 – 1824), 1 painting : Artic
Charles Wilbert White (1918–1979), 1 painting : Artic
Jack Whitten (1939–2018), 1 painting : Artic
Jean-Baptiste Wicar (1762–1834), 1 painting : Artic
Antoine Wiertz (1806–1865), 1 painting : Artic
Guy Carleton Wiggins (1883–1962), 1 painting : Artic
William T. Wiley (1937–2021), 1 painting : Artic
John Willenbecher (born 1936), 1 painting : Artic
Sue Williams (born 1954), 2 paintings : Artic
Karl Wirsum (1939–2021), 5 paintings : Artic
Emanuel de Witte (1617–1692), 1 painting : Artic
David Wojnarowicz (1954–1992), 2 paintings : Artic
John Wollaston (painter) (1672–1749), 3 paintings : Artic
Martin Wong (1946–1999), 1 painting : Artic
Wucius Wong (born 1936), 10 paintings : Artic
Grant Wood (1891–1942), 2 paintings (American Gothic): Artic
Hale Aspacio Woodruff (1900–1980), 1 painting : Artic
Christopher Wool (born 1955), 2 paintings : Artic
Joseph Wright of Derby (1734–1797), 1 painting : Artic
Joachim Wtewael (1566–1638), 1 painting : Artic
Andrew Wyeth (1917–2009), 1 painting : Artic

X
Xia Chang (1388–1470), 1 painting : Artic
Xiang Shengmo (1597–1658), 1 painting : Artic
Xie Zhiliu (1910–1997), 1 painting : Artic
Xu Chongsi (fl.18th Century), 1 painting : Artic
Xugu (1227–1307), 8 paintings : Artic

Y
Yamaguchi Sekkei (1644–1732), 1 painting : Artic
Yamakawa Shūhō (1898–1944), 1 painting : Artic
Yang Jin (1644–1728), 1 painting : Artic
Jack Butler Yeats (1871–1957), 1 painting : Artic
Yongrong (1744–1790), 1 painting : Artic
Ray Yoshida (1930–2009), 10 paintings : Artic
Jack Youngerman (1926–2020), 2 paintings : Artic
Yuan Jiang (c. 1671 – c. 1746), 1 painting : Artic

Z
Eugène Zak (1884–1926), 1 painting : Artic
Zao Wou-Ki (1920–2013), 2 paintings : Artic
Kestutis Edward Zapkus (born 1938), 3 paintings : Artic
Zeng Mi (born 1935), 1 painting : Artic
Arnold Chang (Zhang Hong) (born 1954), 1 painting : Artic
Zhao Chunxiang (1913–1991), 1 painting : Artic
Zhu Daoping (born 1929), 1 painting : Artic
Félix Ziem (1821–1911), 1 painting : Artic
Marguerite Zorach (1887–1968), 1 painting : Artic
William Zorach (1887–1966), 1 painting : Artic
Anders Zorn (1860–1920), 4 paintings : Artic
Joe Zucker (born 1941), 5 paintings : Artic
Ignacio Zuloaga (1870–1945), 1 painting : Artic
Francisco de Zurbarán (1598–1664), 2 paintings : Artic
Juan de Zurbarán (1620–1649), 1 painting : Artic

References

Art Institute of Chicago website
 :commons:Category:Art Institute of Chicago
 Netherlands Institute for Art History

Art Institute of Chicago
Art Institute of Chicago
Paintings in the collection of the Art Institute of Chicago
Chicago-related lists